SRAM may refer to:

Technology
 Static random-access memory, a type of semiconductor memory that uses bistable latching circuitry to store each bit
 Shadow Random Access Memory, for faster ROM chip access

Short-range attack missile
 AGM-69 SRAM, a Boeing nuclear air-to-surface missile
 AGM-131 SRAM II, a nuclear air-to-surface missile intended as a replacement

Other uses
 SRAM Corporation, a manufacturer of bicycle components
 Scientific Review of Alternative Medicine, a peer-reviewed journal devoted exclusively to analyzing the claims of alternative medicine
 Service régional d'admission du Montréal métropolitain, a network of Quebec CEGEPs
 Squash Racquets Association of Malaysia